Peter Burling  (born 1 January 1991) is a New Zealand sailor. He was the 2021 America's Cup winning skipper and helmsman, and the 2017 America's Cup winning helmsman of Team New Zealand, and won an Olympic gold medal in the 49er class at the 2016 games and silver medals in the 2012 and 2020 Olympics.

Burling is a founder of Live Ocean - a registered New Zealand charity which supports and invests in promising marine science, innovation, technology and marine conservation projects.

He was named as male World Sailor of the Year at the ISAF World Sailor of the Year Awards in 2017. He and his 49er partner Blair Tuke also won the award in 2015, and were finalists in 2014 and 2016.

Burling was awarded the Magnus Olsson prize for 2020 "for an indelible contribution to the world of sailing."

He has won six 49er World Championships, two 420 class World Championships and the 2015 Moth World Championships.

Burling sailed as watch captain and helmsman with Team Brunel on the Round-the-World 2017–18 Volvo Ocean Race finishing 3rd overall in the closest finish in the history of the race, with the top 3 boats going into the final leg effectively tied on points and finishing just 25 minutes apart. Team Brunel won 3 of the final 5 legs,  including the leg from Auckland to Brazil, which the organisers say was the hardest leg in the history of the race.

Together with Blair Tuke, he is joint CEO of the New Zealand SailGP team.

Burling married long time partner, Lucinda Nelson, on the weekend of the 4th March 2023 in the Coromandel Pennisula, on New Zealand's North Island. Team mates & friends Blair Tuke, Andy Maloney, and Josh Junior were his groomsmen.

Early life and education
Burling was born in 1991 in Tauranga. His education began at Welcome Bay School and Tauranga Intermediate School.

He started sailing at the age of six in the Welcome Bay estuary near his home in Tauranga, in an old wooden Optimist called Jellytip.  At the age of eight, he joined Tauranga Yacht Club and started competing.

Burling attended high school at Tauranga Boys' College, also attended at the time by cricketer Kane Williamson.

He studied Mechanical Engineering at the University of Auckland where he completed half of the 4 year degree.

Early career 
Burling sailed in his first Optimist nationals at age 9. At the age of 11 in 2002, Burling finished 2nd in the New Zealand Optimist Nationals (under-16). He competed in the 2002 Optimist World Championships in Texas at the age of 11.

In 2003 at the age of 12, Burling won the New Zealand Optimist Nationals and competed in the 2003 Optimist Worlds in the Canary Islands where he finished 40th. He stopped sailing the Optimist at age 12.

At age 13, he was 2nd in the New Zealand P class Nationals (under 17). He won the NZ Starling nationals (under 19) – (winning both the Fleet racing and Matchracing titles) twice – at age 14 and 15.

At the age of fifteen Burling and Carl Evans won the 2006 420 Class Worlds in the Canary Islands – the youngest sailors ever to do so.  They also won the under-16 and under-18 world championships.

At 16 years old Burling successfully defended his 420 title to win the 420 Class Worlds sailed in Auckland. He also won the under-18 world championship.  Burling finished 6th in the 2007 470 Europeans – his first international 470 regatta and had his best world ranking in the 470 of 5th in 2008.

Adult career

America's Cup
Burling was skipper and helmsman for Emirates Team New Zealand's 2021 America's cup campaign. Emirates Team New Zealand won the 2021 America's Cup event in Auckland on 17 March 2021. Emirates Team New Zealand won the 2020 America's Cup World Series event in Auckland December 2020.

He was the helmsman for Emirates Team New Zealand's 2017 America's Cup campaign, which was raced in Bermuda. On 27 June 2017, he became the youngest winning helmsman in the history of the Americas Cup, when at age 26 he and his team won the 35th competition for the cup.

Burling skippered the New Zealand Sailing Team entry to victory in the inaugural Red Bull Youth America's Cup in San Francisco in September 2013.

He helmed for Team Korea's White Tiger Challenge, in the 2011–13 America's Cup World Series in San Francisco in 2012.

Olympic classes

Burling with Blair Tuke were Olympic flag bearers for New Zealand at the 2016 Olympics.  They were just the 4th New Zealand flagbearers to win a gold medal at the same Olympics.

At age 25, Burling was the youngest ever 49er Olympic gold medal skipper. He and Tuke won the 2016 Olympics with two races to spare and by an overall 43 point margin – winning by the most points of any sailing class in the Olympics in over 50 years.

Burling and Tuke won silver at the 2021 Tokyo Olympics - missing the gold medal on countback. 

At the 2012 London Olympics, Burling (then aged 21) was the youngest 49er sailor.  He won the silver medal as helm in the 49er class alongside Blair Tuke. His silver medal was, jointly, New Zealand's 100th Olympic medal.

Burling and Tuke are the first sailors to win six 49er class World Championships (2013, 2014, 2015, 2016, 2019 and 2020).  They won all 28 of the major regattas in the 49er between the London Olympics (2012) and the Rio Olympics (2016). The only regatta they did not win in this time was when they finished 3rd in a short 2 day regatta prior to the Olympics. In all the major regattas (Olympics, Worlds, Europeans, World Cup) in 2015 and 2016 they led into the medal races by over 20 points – effectively winning the regattas before the medal race.

Burling finished 11th in the 470 class at the 2008 Olympics. At 17 years old (still at school), he was the youngest sailor ever to represent New Zealand at the Olympic Games. Burling was the youngest sailing competitor at the 2008 Olympics and the youngest member of the 2008 New Zealand Olympic team.

Offshore sailing
2017–2018 Volvo Ocean race sailing on Team Brunel.

2017 3rd Rolex Fastnet race (Line honours) (sailing on Nikita)

2014 4th Auckland-to-Fiji yacht race (sailing on Wired)

2013 14th (Line honours) Sydney-to-Hobart race (sailing on Pretty Fly 3)

Other sailing
Burling was the 2015 International Moth World Champion. He was 2nd in the 2017 Moth Worlds.

He finished 3rd in the 2014 A class catamaran Worlds.

Awards 
Member of the New Zealand Order of Merit for services to sailing, 2017 New Year Honours.
ISAF Rolex World Male Sailor of the year 2017
ISAF Rolex World Male Sailor of the year 2015 (with Blair Tuke)
Magnus Olsson prize 2020 "for an indelible contribution to the world of sailing."
Lonsdale Cup (NZOC) 2020 (With Blair Tuke) "for a New Zealand athlete (or team) who has demonstrated the most outstanding contribution to an Olympic or Commonwealth sport during the previous year."
Finalist, Rolex World Sailor of the Year 2014, 2015, 2016 (with Blair Tuke), 2017, 2021.
Yachting New Zealand Sailor of the Year 2013, 2014, 2015, 2016 (with Blair Tuke)
Yachting New Zealand Young Sailor of the Year 2006, 2007, 2008, 2011
Halberg Sports Team of the Year 2016. (with Blair Tuke)
Finalist Halberg awards (New Zealand), Team of the Year (with Blair Tuke) 2012, 2013, 2014, 2015, 2016.

Sailing results

Volvo Ocean Race
 2017–2018 – Volvo Ocean Race – Team Brunel (helmsman and watch captain)

America's Cup
 2021 – 36th America's Cup – Emirates Team New Zealand (helmsman and skipper)
 2017 – 35th America's Cup – Emirates Team New Zealand (helmsman)

Olympic Games 
 2021 – 49er class with Blair Tuke
 2016 – 49er class with Blair Tuke
 2012 – 49er class with Blair Tuke (age 21)
11th 2008 – 470 Class with Carl Evans (age 17)

World Championships

World Championship titles
 2020 – 49er World Champion  – Geelong, Australia (with Blair Tuke)
 2019 – 49er World Champion  – Auckland, New Zealand (with Blair Tuke)
 2016 – 49er World Champion  – Clearwater, Florida, USA (with Blair Tuke)
 2015 – 49er World Champion  – Buenos Aires, Argentina (with Blair Tuke)
 2015 – Moth World Champion  – Sorrento, Australia.
 2014 – 49er World Champion  – Santander, Spain (with Blair Tuke)
 2013 – 49er World Champion Marseille, France (with Blair Tuke)
 2007 – 420 Open World Champion, age 16.
 2006 – 420 Open World Champion, age 15.

Other World Championship results
2nd – 2017 – 2nd Int Moth World Championships – Lake Garda, Italy 
2nd – 2012 – 2nd 49er World Championships – Croatia (with Blair Tuke)
2nd – 2011 – 2nd 49er World Championships – Perth, Australia (with Blair Tuke)
3rd – 2014 – 3rd A class catamaran World Championships – Auckland, New Zealand (first rookie)
3rd – 2009 – 3rd ISAF Teams Racing Worlds – Perth, Australia
4th – 2019 – A class World Championships Australia
10th – 2013 – Moth World Championships Hawaii
4th – 2011 – Moth World Championships Lake Macquarie, Australia
17th – 2010 – 49er World Championships – Bahamas (with Blair Tuke)
26th – 2009 – 49er World Championships – Lake Garda, Italy (with Blair Tuke)
11th – 2008 – 470 World Championships (with Carl Evans)age 17
45th – 2007 – 470 World Championships (with Carl Evans) age 16
6th – 2005 – 420 Open World Championships (helm)
40th – 2003 – Optimist World Championships – Canary Islands (age 12)
116th – 2002 – Optimist World Championships – Texas (age 11).

Other achievements 
2013, 2014, 2015 and 2016 Unbeaten in major 49er regattas worldwide (27 49er regatta victories since London Olympics).

2013 Skipper of the winning boat in the Red Bull Youth America's Cup.

2020:-
2020  1st Prada America’s Cup World Series Auckland (skipper and helm for Emirates Team New Zealand)

2020 49er regattas:-
2020  1st 49er World Championships  – Geelong, Australia (sailing with Blair Tuke)

2020  2nd 49er Oceanias (sailing with Blair Tuke)

2019 49er regattas:-
2019  1st 49er World Championships  – Auckland, New Zealand (sailing with Blair Tuke)

2019  3rd 49er Oceanias (sailing with Blair Tuke)

2019 7th Princessa Sofia Regatta (sailing with Blair Tuke)

2019  3rd World Cup Regatta Genoa (sailing with Blair Tuke)

2019  1st 49er Europeans (sailing with Blair Tuke)

2019  1st 49er Olympic test event (sailing with Blair Tuke)

2017:-
2017 Rolex Fastnet race 3rd (Line honours) (sailing on Nikita)

2017  2nd – 2017 – 2nd Int Moth World Championships – Lake Garda, Italy

2017  1st (Emirates Team New Zealand) Americas Cup. – Helm

2017  1st (Emirates Team New Zealand) Louis Vuitton America’s Cup Challenger Playoffs Finals – Helm

2017  1st Swan River Match Cup (Perth) – helm, sailing with Blair Tuke, Glenn Ashby, Josh Junior.

2016 49er regattas:-
2016  1st 49er Rio Olympics

2016  3rd 49er Rio de Janeiro International Sailing week

2016  1st 49er Kieler Woche regatta, Germany (with Blair Tuke)

2016  1st 49er Sailing World Cup Hyeres regatta, France (with Blair Tuke)

2016  1st 49er European Championships – Barcelona, Spain (with Blair Tuke)

2016  1st 49er World Championships  – Clearwater, Florida, USA (with Blair Tuke)

2016  1st 49er NZL Nationals (with Blair Tuke)

2016 America's Cup World Series regattas
Helm for Emirates Team New Zealand

2015–2016 3rd overall in 2015–2016 America's Cup World Series.

2016  1st America's Cup World Series regatta, New York

2016  3rd America's Cup World Series regatta, Oman

2016 4th America's Cup World Series regatta, Chicago

2016 5th America's Cup World Series regatta, Toulon, France

2016 4th America's Cup World Series regatta, Japan

2015 49er regattas:-
2015  1st 49er World Championships  – Buenos Aires, Argentina (with Blair Tuke)

2015  1st 49er South American Champs, Buenos Aires (with Blair Tuke)

2015  1st 49er Olympic Test Event, Rio de Janeiro (with Blair Tuke)(Aug 2015)

2015  1st 49er Rio de Janeiro International sailing week (with Blair Tuke)(Aug 2015)

2015  1st 49er Europeans (Porto, Portugal) (with Blair Tuke)

2015  1st 49er ISAF Sailing World Cup Weymouth regatta (Weymouth, England) (with Blair Tuke)

2015  1st 49er ISAF Sailing World Cup Hyeres regatta (Hyeres, France) (with Blair Tuke)

2015  1st 49er Princess Sofia Regatta (Palma, Mallorca) (with Blair Tuke)

2015  1st 49er Sail Auckland (with Blair Tuke)

2015  1st 49er NZL Nationals (with Blair Tuke)

2015 America's Cup World Series regattas
Helm for Emirates Team New Zealand – overall leader of 2015 America's Cup World Series.

2015  2nd America's Cup World Series Bermuda (Oct 2015)

2015  1st America's Cup World Series Gothenburg (Aug 2015)

2015  2nd America's Cup World Series Portsmouth

2014 
2014  1st 49er Intergalactic Championships, Rio de Janeiro (with Blair Tuke)

2014  1st 49er South American Championships, Rio de Janeiro (with Blair Tuke)

2014 1st 49er World Championships  – Santander, Spain (with Blair Tuke)

2014  1st 49er Rio International Regatta, Rio de Janeiro (with Blair Tuke)

2014  1st 49er European Championships, Helsinki (with Blair Tuke)

2014  1st 49er Hyeres World cup regatta (with Blair Tuke)

2014  1st 49er Mallorca World cup regatta (with Blair Tuke)

2014  3rd Extreme Sailing series St Petersburg, Russia (helming for Emirates Team New Zealand)

2014  3rd Extreme Sailing series Qingdao, China (helming for Emirates Team New Zealand)

2014 4th Auckland-to-Fiji yacht race (sailing on Wired)

2014  1st A class NZ Nationals (Pre-worlds, 65 International competitors, his first competition in A class)

2013 and previous 
2013 14th (Line Honours) Sydney-to-Hobart race sailing on Pretty Fly 3

2013  1st – Red Bull Youth America's Cup (skipper/ helm for NZL sailing team)

2013  1st 49er European Championships (Aarhus, Denmark)

2013  1st – Australian Moth Nationals

2013  2nd China cup (Tactician for Team Vatti)

2013  1st 49er Sail Auckland (with Blair Tuke)

2012  1st China cup (Tactician for Team Vatti)

2010  1st 49er North American Championships (with Blair Tuke)

2009 Completed 120 nm Coastal Classic course in 49er (Auckland to Russell) with Blair Tuke

2009  New Zealand National Youth Matchracing Champion (with Blair Tuke and Scott Burling)

2008  2nd New Zealand Keelboat Nationals

2008  New Zealand Champion in Elliot 5.9 (helm)

2006  New Zealand Champion in Starling (age 15)

2006  New Zealand Champion in 420 (age 15)

2006  1st 420 Junior Europeans (age 15)

2005  New Zealand Champion in Starling (age 14)

2005  New Zealand Champion in 420 (age 14)

2005  New Zealand Champion in Elliot 5.9 (helm)(age 14)

2004  2nd NZ P class Nationals (age 13)

2003  1st NZ Optimist Nationals (age 12)

2002  2nd NZ Optimist Nationals (age 11)

References

External links
 
 
 
 
 

|-

|-

1991 births
Living people
People educated at Tauranga Boys' College
Sportspeople from Tauranga
Sailors at the 2008 Summer Olympics – 470
Sailors at the 2012 Summer Olympics – 49er
Sailors at the 2016 Summer Olympics – 49er
New Zealand male sailors (sport)
Olympic silver medalists for New Zealand
Olympic gold medalists for New Zealand in sailing
Medalists at the 2012 Summer Olympics
Medalists at the 2016 Summer Olympics
Medalists at the 2020 Summer Olympics
Extreme Sailing Series sailors
49er class world champions
ISAF World Sailor of the Year (male)
Members of the New Zealand Order of Merit
Team New Zealand sailors
420 class world champions
Team Korea sailors
2017 America's Cup sailors
Volvo Ocean Race sailors
World champions in sailing for New Zealand
Moth class world champions
2021 America's Cup sailors
Sailors at the 2020 Summer Olympics – 49er